Idrottsföreningen Kamraterna Malmö, more commonly known as IFK Malmö, is a Swedish sports club with several departments, located in Malmö. The club was founded on 23 April 1899.

The football department of IFK Malmö is one of the oldest football clubs in Sweden.

Departments
 Bandy, see IFK Malmö Bandy
 Association football, see IFK Malmö Fotboll
 Handball, see IFK Malmö Handboll

External links
 

 
Sport in Malmö
Malmo ifk